Onthophagus favrei, is a species of dung beetle found in India, and Sri Lanka.

Description
This oval, medium convex species has an average length of about 5 to 7.5 mm. Male is smaller than female. Body black or lark brown and not shiny. There is a slight metallic lustre on the head and pronotum. Elytra possess small orange marks at the base and apex. Pygidium, abdominal sides, femora, antenna and mouthparts are orange. Dorsum and ventrum both covered by minute pale setae. Head less broad, with round ocular lobes. Pronotum moderately finely and closely punctured. Elytra finely striate, with flat and minutely granulate intervals. Pygidium fairly strongly punctured. Metasternal shield finely and sparingly. Male has closely, punctured head, pointed clypeus, and forehead not separated from the clypeus. Pair of horns are with broad base. Female has transversely rugose clypeus. Forehead is well punctured.

References 

Scarabaeinae
Insects of India
Beetles of Sri Lanka
Insects described in 1914